NGC 4586 is a spiral galaxy located about 50 million light-years away in the constellation Virgo. The galaxy was discovered by astronomer William Herschel on February 2, 1786. Although listed in the Virgo Cluster Catalog, NGC 4586 is considered to be a member of the Virgo II Groups which form a southern extension of the Virgo cluster. NGC 4586 is currently in the process of infalling into the Virgo Cluster and is predicted to enter the cluster in about 500 million years.

Boxy/Peanut bulge 
NGC 4586 has a boxy or peanut-shaped bulge. The bulge has been interpreted to be a bar viewed edge-on.

See also
 List of NGC objects (4001–5000)
 NGC 4469
 NGC 4013

References

External links

Virgo (constellation)
Unbarred spiral galaxies
4586
42241
7804
Astronomical objects discovered in 1786
Discoveries by William Herschel